Joel Rintala (born 24 July 1996) is a field hockey player from Australia, who plays as a forward.

Personal life
Joel Rintala was born and raised in Townsville, Queensland.

He is currently in a relationship with Australian swimmer, Shayna Jack.

Career

Domestic league
Rintala is a member of the Brisbane Blaze in Australia's national league, the Sultana Bran Hockey One. He made his debut in the inaugural season of the league.

Following his 2019 debut, he appeared in season two in 2022.

National teams

Burras
Rintala made his international debut at under–21 level during the 2017 Sultan of Johor Cup. He was a member of the Burras gold medal winning campaign.

Kookaburras
In 2022, Rintala was named in the Kookaburras squad for the first time. He will make his debut for the team in 2023.

References

External links

1996 births
Living people
Australian male field hockey players
Male field hockey forwards